Tommy Jakobsen (born 10 December 1970) is a Norwegian former professional ice hockey defenceman.

He is the most experienced player on the Norwegian national team going into the 2009 IIHF World Championship with 125 official matches.
Jakobsen participated in the 1992 Winter Olympics in Albertville, and the games at Lillehammer two years later.

He was his country's flag bearer during the opening ceremony of the 2010 Olympic Games in Vancouver. He also wore the captaincy for the hockey team.

Jakobsen was expelled from the 2010 World Championship tournament for intentional physical contact with an on-ice official during a 12-1 loss to Canada.

Career statistics

Regular season and playoffs

International

References

External links

1970 births
Living people
Augsburger Panther players
DEG Metro Stars players
Djurgårdens IF Hockey players
Furuset Ishockey players
Graz 99ers players
Ice hockey players at the 1992 Winter Olympics
Ice hockey players at the 1994 Winter Olympics
Ice hockey players at the 2010 Winter Olympics
Lillehammer IK players
Lørenskog IK players
Norwegian expatriate ice hockey people
Norwegian ice hockey defencemen
Olympic ice hockey players of Norway
Ice hockey people from Oslo
SC Bern players
Spektrum Flyers players